A fire alarm is an alarm that warns people about a fire.

Fire alarm may also refer to:
Fire alarm control panel, a controlling component
Manual fire alarm activation, a pull station
Fire alarm call box, a device used for notifying a fire department
Fire alarm notification appliance, an active fire protection component
The Fire Alarm, a Looney Tunes animated cartoon

See also
Multiple-alarm fire, a classification of the seriousness of a fire